Fanud (also Romanized as Fanūd) is a village in Mud Rural District, Mud District, Sarbisheh County, South Khorasan Province, Iran. At the 2006 census, its population was 327, in 108 families.

References 

Populated places in Sarbisheh County